The 2014 Oregon Ducks football team represented the University of Oregon in the 2014 NCAA Division I FBS football season. The team was led by second-year head coach Mark Helfrich and played their home games at Autzen Stadium for the 48th straight year. They are a member of the Pac-12 Conference in the North Division.

The 2014 Ducks finished the season with a 13–2 overall record, went 8–1 in Pac-12 play, and outscored their opponents by a combined total of 681 to 354. The Ducks won the Pac-12 North Division for the second time since the division's creation in 2011, advancing to the Pac-12 Football Championship Game, where they defeated the Arizona Wildcats 51–13. The Ducks played in the inaugural College Football Playoff, netting a berth in the 2014 Rose Bowl semifinal game, where they defeated the Florida State Seminoles 59–20, advancing to the 2014 College Football Playoff National Championship game facing the Ohio State Buckeyes. This was Oregon's second-ever national championship game appearance (their first was the 2010 BCS National Championship Game, in which they lost to Auburn). They were defeated in the National Championship by Ohio State by a score of 42–20. The Ducks finished the season as consensus national runners-up behind the national champion Buckeyes and ahead of Peach Bowl victors TCU.

The Oregon offense ranked among the very best in the country and was led by junior quarterback Marcus Mariota, who became the first player in school history to win the Heisman Trophy, distinguishing him as the best player in college football. Mariota led the nation in touchdowns responsible for, total yards, and passer efficiency rating.

Previous season

Summary
The Ducks had high hopes coming off of a 12–1 (8–1) season a victory in the 2013 Fiesta Bowl; many considered them a contender for the BCS national championship game the following year. However, these hopes were thrown into question shortly after their Fiesta Bowl victory, on January 16, 2013. Head coach Chip Kelly announced that he had agreed to terms with the Philadelphia Eagles to become their new head coach after several disappointing seasons under Andy Reid; Kelly brought Oregon defensive line coach Jerry Azzinaro along with him to Philadelphia.

As they have done in every case of hiring a new head coach since 1995, the Ducks hired from within and promoted fourth-year offensive coordinator and quarterbacks coach Mark Helfrich to the head coach position. Along with the head coach change, wide receivers coach Scott Frost was promoted to offensive coordinator and quarterbacks coach, and Duke wide receivers coach Matt Lubick and Arizona Cardinals defensive line coach Ron Aiken were hired to fill their respective positions on Oregon's staff.

Oregon started the season ranked third behind Ohio State and Alabama, and rose to second after their first game, a 66–3 win over Nicholls State in Week 1. They continued their winning ways, posting double-digit wins over Virginia, Tennessee, California, Colorado, Washington, Washington State and UCLA, and eventually found themselves in a duel with Florida State over the number 2 spot in the BCS poll, with Alabama at number 1. The wheels came off though, as they did the year previously, against Stanford, losing 26–20 on the road. The Ducks would rebound with a home win over Utah, but lose again at home to Arizona, the Ducks’ first loss to an unranked foe since 2009.

Sitting at 9–2 (7–2) and out of the BCS bowl picture for the first time in four years, Oregon had the Civil War left to play. Both Oregon and Oregon State were coming off of losses and had no major spoils to play for. Oregon came from behind in a back-and-forth fourth quarter and scored a touchdown (and failed to convert the two-point attempt) with 29 seconds left to win, 36–35.

Finishing the regular season at 10–2 (7–2) Oregon had extended winning streaks in two major rivalries, making it 10 years in a row against Washington, and six years in a row against Oregon State, as well as achieving a sixth consecutive 10-win season and an undefeated season at home for the first time in three years.

On December 8, 2013, the Ducks were invited to play in the Alamo Bowl against Texas in what would be Texas head coach Mack Brown and Oregon defensive coordinator Nick Aliotti's last games before retiring. Oregon won the Alamo bowl 30–7, tying a school record set from 1999 to 2001 for consecutive bowl wins at three, with rookie head coach Mark Helfrich becoming the first Oregon head coach to go to and win a bowl game in his rookie year (Rich Brooks won his first bowl game, after 12 years as head coach at Oregon, Mike Belloti and Chip Kelly each went to and lost a bowl game in their first years). Oregon finished the season at 11–2, only their fifth season with 11 or more wins in 118 years of football.

Departing players
Following the 2013 season there was a whirlwind of speculation in Eugene about the futures of several star players eligible to leave early for the NFL. The first announcements came from starting quarterback Marcus Mariota (RSo.) and starting center Hroniss Grasu (Jr.), declaring that they would stay at Oregon in order to finish their degrees. Later in the week, defensive leaders Tony Washington (RJr.) and Derrick Malone (Jr.) announced that they too would be staying in Eugene to finish their education.

The first Duck to declare that he would be leaving school early and pursuing a career in the NFL was starting cornerback Terrance Mitchell (Jr.), many considered it to be a poor decision, and that another year in college would boost his potential draft status. Nonetheless, he was drafted in the seventh round by the Dallas Cowboys and did not end up making the final roster, he was signed by the Chicago Bears as a member of their practice squad prior to the 2014 NFL season.

Following the surprise announcement from Terrance Mitchell, the most anticipated announcement finally came from star running back De'Anthony Thomas (Jr.), declaring that he will forgo his senior year and enter the NFL Draft. Few people were surprised by this decision after recording three solid years as a featured part of the ducks offense, setting records in the Rose Bowl and Fiesta Bowl. He would go on to be drafted in the fifth round by the Kansas City Chiefs and would make the final 53-man roster, showing off his value to the team in his first NFL appearance, returning a punt 80-yards for a touchdown.

The final announcement came from Ifo Ekpre-Olomu (Jr.) declaring that he would stay at Oregon in order to earn his degree and hone his skills as a cornerback.

Other notable departures due to graduation included record breaking receiver Josh Huff who would be drafted by Oregon's former head coach Chip Kelly to be a member of the Philadelphia Eagles, as well as three starting defensive tackles Taylor Hart, Ricky Havili-Heimuli and Wade Keliikipi.

† - Colt Lyerla left the team in September 2013 after missing game time due to suspension and illness. After leaving the team Lyerla was arrested for use and possession of cocaine. After the season Lyerla participated in the NFL Combine as well as Oregon's Pro Day.

Before the season

Returning starters

Offense

Defense

Special teams

Recruiting

Preseason All-Americans
Oregon had three players selected as Preseason All-Americans going into the season. Marcus Mariota was largely recognized on the second team of those organizations which published preseason lists. Hroniss Grasu and Ifo Ekpre-Olomu were recognized as unanimous Preseason All-Americans, with Grasu being selected to the first team of every publication.

Quarterback

Marcus Mariota, Junior, Quarterback (SI, Athlon, USA Today, ESPN, CBS Sports, CFN)

Offensive line
Hroniss Grasu, Senior, Center (SI, Athlon, USA Today, ESPN, CBS Sports, CFN, Scout.com)

Defensive back
Ifo Ekpre-Olomu, Senior, Cornerback (SI, Athlon, USA Today, ESPN, CBS Sports, CFN, Scout.com)

References:Awards watchlistsOverall AwardsMaxwell Award – College Football Player of the Year
 Marcus Mariota
 Byron Marshall
 Thomas TynerWalter Camp Award – Player of the Year
 Marcus Mariota
 Ifo Ekpre-OlomuLombardi Award – Best Lineman
 Hroniss Grasu
 Tyler Johnstone
 Derrick MaloneOffensive AwardsDavey O'Brien Award – Best Quarterback
 Marcus MariotaDoak Walker Award – Best Runningback
 Byron Marshall
 Thomas TynerMackey Award – Most Outstanding Collegiate Tight End
 Pharaoh Brown
 Johnny MundtRimington Trophy – Most Outstanding Collegiate Center
 Hroniss GrasuOutland Trophy – Best Interior Lineman in College Football
 Hroniss Grasu
 Tyler JohnstoneDefensive AwardsBednarik Award – Defensive Player of the Year
 Ifo Ekpre-OlomuBronko Nagurski Trophy – Most Outstanding Defensive Player
 Ifo Ekpre-Olomu
 Derrick Malone
 Tony WashingtonJim Thorpe Award – Best Defensive Back
 Ifo Ekpre-OlomuButkus Award – Best Linebacker
 Derrick Malone

Spring football

On May 3, 2014, Oregon capped off its spring football camp with a scrimmage at Autzen Stadium that was open to the public and broadcast live on the Pac-12 Network. The Monday before the game, team captains were selected followed by a draft. Quarterback Marcus Mariota and center Hroniss Grasu captained team "Mariasu" which was coached by the offensive coordinator Scott Frost and the other offensive coaches. Defensive end Tony Washington and cornerback Ifo Ekpre-Olomu captained team "Twifo" which was coached by defensive coordinator Don Pellum and the other defensive coaches; head coach Mark Helfrich observed the game from the field.

As has been the case for the past several years, the spring game was dedicated to the United States Armed Forces, specifically local units that include 6th Engineer Support Battalion in Portland, Oregon and the Oregon National Guard. Service-members were given special seating at the 50-yard line, ran onto the field with the players and were given the jerseys worn by the players immediately following the game. In between the first and second quarters a group of soon-to-be soldiers took the oath of enlistment in the west end-zone and at half-time an American Flag was presented by the Oregon National Guard to the University President Michael R. Gottfredson.

In addition to honoring the troops, the spring game is used as a means to boost donations to Food for Lane County, a local non-profit food bank. There is no monetary cost of admission to enter the game, however a donation of 3 non-perishable food items per person is encouraged. Food for Lane County has reported donations just short of sixty thousand pounds of non-perishable food.

Unlike the previous year's spring game, this game was as close to normal football rules as possible. The first half followed all NCAA rules and regulations, with the second half featuring a running clock.

Marcus Mariota led back to back scoring drives to start off the game, throwing touchdown passes to Thomas Tyner and Devon Allen, after that the star quarterback sat out the rest of the game. For the remainder of the first half the defenses of both teams took control, not allowing another score and forcing several turnovers. After the half-time ceremonies team Mariasu got on the board again, this time on the arm of Jeff Lockie throwing to Austin Daich. It took until the fourth quarter for team Twifo to score on a touchdown pass from Taylor Allie to Darren Carrington, team Mariasu would respond with a touchdown pass from Damion Hobbs to Devon Allen, however the play occurred as time expired so no PAT was attempted.

Regular season

Schedule
The 2014 Pac-12 schedule was officially released on January 8, 2014. Oregon played against all five North Division schools: California, Oregon State, Stanford, Washington and Washington State. They also played against four South Division opponents: Arizona, Colorado, UCLA and Utah; they will not play against Arizona State or USC, unless it is for the conference championship. For their non-conference slate the Ducks played against the South Dakota Coyotes of the Missouri Valley Conference, the 2014 Rose Bowl winners and reigning Big Ten conference champions, the Michigan State Spartans and the Wyoming Cowboys of the Mountain West Conference.

Rankings

Entering the 2014 season the Ducks were ranked at number 3 in the AP Preseason Poll and number 4 in the Coaches' Preseason Poll, receiving a first place vote in each. After a dominant performance against South Dakota the Ducks remained at number 3 and number 4 in the AP and USA Today polls respectively, but gained first placed votes in each. Following a decisive victory over #7 Michigan State the Ducks rose to second in the AP poll, while remaining fourth in the USA Coaches Poll. Coming out of a week three victory over Wyoming the Ducks maintained their second place slot in the AP poll and rose to third in USA Today Coaches' Poll, earning first place votes in each.

Following their first conference victory the Ducks lost ground in both polls, falling to fourth in the Coaches' Poll and losing 5 five first place votes in the AP poll due to their unconvincing victory over Washington State. The Ducks continued to slide down the polls following a crushing upset by Arizona, falling to twelfth in the AP poll and eleventh in the Coaches'. However, the Ducks soon rebounded, rising up through the polls and finishing at number 2 in the CFP poll and number 3 in both the AP and the coaches' polls at the conclusion of the regular season.  After their 59–20 win over FSU in the Rose Bowl, the Ducks met the Ohio State Buckeyes in the College Football Playoff National Championship, where they lost 42–20, finishing their season ranked #2 in both the AP and the Coaches polls.

Personnel

Oregon head coach Mark Helfrich returns in his second year as Oregon's head coach following what many have considered to be a disappointing debut season, even though he earned 11 wins, including a bowl game victory, something never before achieved by a first year Oregon head coach. Following the retirement of longtime defensive coordinator & outside linebackers coach Nick Aliotti at the end of the 2013 season Oregon promoted veteran inside linebackers coach and University of Oregon alumni Don Pellum to the defensive coordinator position (he would maintain the inside linebackers coach position). To fill the opening at outside linebackers coach Oregon hired former graduate assistant Erik Chinander who at the time was working for the Philadelphia Eagles.

The Ducks continue to have the longest tenured staff of any college football program in the United States. Six of the ten assistant positions are staffed by men who have coached at Oregon for over ten years, four of whom have over 25 years of experience as Oregon assistant coaches.

Roster

Depth chart

Game summaries

South Dakota

In their home opener the Ducks defeated the South Dakota Coyotes 62–13 in their first ever meeting. To open the game the Ducks won the coin toss, elected to receive and marched down the field on a four-play, 74-yard drive lasting 94 seconds, which ended in a 62-yard touchdown pass from Marcus Mariota to Dwyane Stanford, followed by a successful two-point conversion run in by Taylor Alie. This touchdown was Mariota's 78th overall as a Duck, beating Joey Harrington for most career combined touchdowns. The Coyotes responded with a 4 and a half-minute drive which ended in a 47-yard field goal from Miles Bergner. On the next Oregon drive, the Ducks went 63 yards in three plays lasting just over a minute, culminating in a 41-yard touchdown pass from Mariota to Byron Marshall. A two-point conversion was attempted, but nullified due to an illegal formation penalty caused by too many players on the line of scrimmage, putting the game at 14–3. South Dakota was forced to punt on the next possession; the punt was downed at the Oregon 1-yard line, and pushed back an additional 6 yards due to an illegal blocking penalty. The Ducks responded with a 9-play, 97-yard drive finished off with true freshman Royce Freeman scoring his first touchdown as an Oregon Duck.

South Dakota retained possession from the end of the first quarter into the beginning of the second and would finish their drive with a punt, downed at the Oregon 29-yard line. Oregon couldn't get things going on their first possession of the second quarter and had a 3 and out on a negative running play from Thomas Tyner, two incomplete passes and a punt which was returned to the 50-yard line. South Dakota fought back and put together an 8 play, 42-yard drive culminating in a 25-yard field goal, putting the game at 21–6 with 9:26 left in the half. The Ducks returned the ensuing kick-off to their own 42 yard line and were in the end-zone 5 plays later after a 26-yard run from Freeman. Oregon then forced the Coyotes to punt, taking possession at their own 46 yard line. Byron Marshall started the drive off by breaking free on a 53-yard run, only to drop the ball in celebration on the 1 yard line, the ball went into the end-zone and then out of bounds, causing a touch-back, giving the Coyotes the ball at their own 20 yard line. Oregon's defense then forced the Coyotes to fumble, which Oregon defensive back Dior Mathis recovered. Oregon turned the fumble into points 5 plays later with a touchdown pass from Mariota to Marshall to put the game at 35–6. South Dakota's next drive would be their only drive resulting in a touchdown, they drove the ball 75-yards in 6 plays, finishing with a 3-yard run from Trevor Bouma. The Ducks then recorded the final scoring drive of the first half, going 76-yard on 10 plays, finishing with a 1-yard run from Mariota, only to have the point after attempt fail due to a bad snap. The teams went into the locker rooms at halftime with score at 41–13.

Ahead by 28 points and moving the ball at will, the Ducks played many of their backups in the second half. South Dakota was shut out for the entire second half, with Oregon's second string putting together three touchdown drives: a 50-yard punt return by Charles Nelson, a 4-yard touchdown pass from Jeff Lockie to Pharaoh Brown and 9-yard run from Kenny Bassett. While they did not score, South Dakota did close out the fourth quarter with a 69-yard, 17-play drive lasting just over 9 minutes that at one point was on the Oregon 2-yard line, but ended in a turnover on downs, leaving the final score at 62–13.

In the game, Mariota passed for three touchdowns and 267 yards, leaving him tied with Darron Thomas for career passing touchdowns (66) and 22 yards away from breaking Bill Musgrave's record for career total offense (8,140 yards).

Michigan State

In the first game between non-conference top ten teams in the history of Autzen Stadium, Oregon defeated the seventh ranked Michigan State Spartans 46–27. The Spartans won the coin toss and elected to receive, leading off a series of back and forth punts for the first nine minutes of play. While driving down the field during their third possession of the game, Michigan State quarterback Connor Cook was intercepted at the Oregon 38 yard line by Erik Dargan. Oregon turned the interception into points two minutes later off of a hard driven 1-yard run by Thomas Tyner, followed by a two-point conversion pass from Taylor Alie to DeForest Buckner. Michigan State would punt the ball on their next possession, closing out the first quarter with Oregon leading 8–0.

Oregon finished their first possession of the second quarter with a 28-yard field goal from Matt Wogan to put the game at 11–0, but the remainder of the quarter would belong to Michigan State. The Spartans would go on a 24–7 run, scoring points on all four of their second quarter possessions. While the Spartan defense did allow a 70-yard touchdown pass from Marcus Mariota to track star Devon Allen early in the quarter, they forced the Ducks to punt the ball twice in as many possessions, while also getting two quarterback sacks. Going into half time with the score at 24–18 and the Ducks on the ropes, the Spartans looked to be on their way to victory.

Oregon stumbled out of the gate and was forced to punt from their own end zone to start the half, with Michigan State scoring a field goal not long after. However, the rest of the second half would belong to the Ducks, with a commanding defensive performance, Michigan State would not score another point the rest of the game. After the Michigan State field goal, the Ducks and Spartans traded punts, with the Ducks offense looking overwhelmed with the fierce defensive line play from the reigning Big Ten Champions. On their next drive however, Marcus Mariota took over the game for his team, and led the Ducks to scoring drives on their next three possessions.

Going into the fourth quarter, the tables had turned on Michigan State, with the Ducks leading the game 39–27. The stout Duck defense would force a turnover on downs deep in their own territory, but on the ensuing possession Oregon was again forced to punt the ball away, giving Michigan State the ball, down 12 points with nine minutes left to play. The Oregon defense again showed their talent by intercepting Connor Cook again, giving their offense back the ball to close out the game. The Oregon offense then methodically drove the 96 yards in six and a half minutes, converting two third downs and scoring a touchdown on fourth down to all but finish the game at 46–27. The victory improved Oregon's all-time record against the Spartans to 3–2.

During the game Marcus Mariota threw for 3 touchdown passes, improving his career total to 69, breaking the Oregon record previously held by his predecessor Darron Thomas. Mariota also broke the team record for total-offense, previously held by Bill Musgrave. His 318 passing yards extended his career total to 6,297, passing Joey Harrington for fourth in the Oregon record books.

Wyoming

In their final non-conference game of the regular season the Ducks defeated the Wyoming Cowboys in their first meeting. The Cowboys won the coin toss and elected to receive the first kickoff of the game, Wyoming and Oregon traded punts for their first drives. The Cowboys scored on their second possession, an eleven play, 98-yard drive culminating in an 18-yard touchdown pass from Colby Kirkegaard to Tanner Gentry; the Ducks would not score in the first quarter. Going into the second quarter with the ball and the score 7–0 in favor of Wyoming, the Ducks responded to the Cowboys with four unanswered touchdown drives, scoring on 15 and 19 yard runs from Marcus Mariota, a 30-yard run by Byron Marshall and a 16-yard pass from Mariota to Devon Allen. Erick Dargan would intercept Wyoming quarterback Colby Kirkegaard twice during the second quarter, with Oregon turning both interceptions into touchdowns. On the touchdown run by Marshall the Ducks failed to convert the PAT, the teams went to the locker rooms at half-time with the score at 27–7 in favor of the Ducks.

The Ducks continued to put up points, scoring on their first possession of the second half from a 12-yard run by Royce Freeman. For Wyoming's first possession of the second half they turned the ball over after four plays, with Kirkegaard being strip-sacked by Torrodney Prevot, the ball recovered by Christian French. The Ducks again turned a turnover into a touchdown, with Mariota throwing a 5-yard touchdown pass to Johnathan Loyd, his first touchdown as an Oregon Duck football player, to go with his 538 points, 167 rebounds, 368 assists and 118 steals as Oregon's winningest men's basketball player. Wyoming scored in the early minutes of the fourth quarter, bringing the score to 41–14. For the rest of the game the Ducks played most of their backups, and would trade long drives with the Cowboys to run out the clock. Oregon took advantage of their final possession with Kani Benoit running in a 1-yard touchdown to finish off a 15 play, 79-yard drive lasting five and a half minutes. The Cowboys tried to score on their final possession, a 14 play drive going 55-yards and lasting nearly seven minutes, however the Duck defense forced a turnover on downs with ninety seconds to go.

During the game Oregon's offensive line continued to be hampered by the injury bug with left tackle Jake Fisher appearing to suffer a high-ankle sprain, along with the loss of Andre Yruretagoyena during the previous week's win over Michigan State, the Ducks will be forced to start backups at both right and left tackle until both men are healthy.

Washington State

In their first conference game of the 2014 season the Ducks narrowly defeated the Washington State Cougars in Pullman, 38–31. Washington State won the coin toss, elected to receive and were forced into a three-and-out on their first drive. The Ducks came out of the gate sloppily, punting on their first drive gaining negative yardage and allowing Marcus Mariota to be sacked. The rest of the first half was a story of the Cougars scoring after long drives, often doing so by making the Oregon defense look terrible against the pass in the process, and Oregon responding with one or two play scoring drives, often taking less than one minute to complete. By the end of the half the score was tied at 21, with time of possession heavily skewed in the Cougars favor nearly two to one. Washington State appeared to be succeeding at a tried and true method of defeating the Ducks: sustaining long offensive drives and achieving crippling penetration of the offensive line. With backups at left and right tackle, Marcus Mariota had been sacked five times in the first half.

The story of the second half would be markedly different, with the Ducks having made several adjustments on both sides of the ball. Marcus Mariota was now holding the ball for a significantly shorter period of time in the pocket, often only reading two receivers before running out of the pocket or throwing the ball away. This allowed the Ducks to sustain drives going forward and would lead to the Ducks having the edge in time of possession in the second half (nearly two to one, this time in their favor). On defense, the Cougars were still able to go down the field with relative ease, however the Oregon defense forced several turnovers and field goals, shutting out the Cougars in the third quarter, and only allowing one touchdown for the rest of the game. 
In the third quarter both teams missed relatively short field goals, though Oregon scored on a pass from Mariota to Pharaoh Brown following a Washington State fumble, forced by DeForest Buckner.

Going into the fourth quarter ahead 28–21, the Ducks were still very much fighting to maintain ahead of the Cougars. The quarter began with a 30-yard field goal made by Washington State, only to be responded to by a 34-yard field goal from the Ducks. Washington State then drove the length of the field and scored, tying the game again, at 31. Oregon responded with the final scoring drive of the game with a touchdown pass from Mariota to Keanon Lowe, putting the Ducks up by a touchdown with 5:33 to go in the game. After two completions by the Cougars the Oregon defense bowed their necks, not allowing another play of positive yardage, and sacking the Cougars quarterback Connor Halliday on fourth down, giving the Oregon offense the ball, with the lead, and 3:34 on the clock. The Ducks then ran out the clock, and returned home with a hard-fought win, and serious questions about their offensive line, and defensive secondary.

By the end of the game much could be said about the quarterback play by both teams, with a combined completion rate over 70%, 765 passing yards, nine touchdowns and zero interceptions. However, the star of the game was Marcus Mariota, completing 21 of 25 passes attempted, for an 84% completion rating, to go with 329 yards through the air and 58 on the ground, and five touchdown passes.

The Ducks extended their lead in the series to 49-36-7 (.571), as well as continuing their current win streak to eight consecutive years. They would travel home facing a bye week in which to work on inconsistencies and heal followed by a Thursday night game against the Arizona Wildcats, a team they lost to in 2013.

Arizona

In a week that saw 11 of the top 25 teams, including five of the top eight, all undefeated, be upset in conference play, the Ducks were upset for the second straight year by the Arizona Wildcats in the 100th consecutive sell-out of Autzen Stadium. The Ducks won the coin toss, elected to receive and were eventually forced to turn the ball over on downs, after having converted a fourth down earlier in their opening drive. The Wildcats capitalized on their opening drive by scoring a 28-yard field goal. The Oregon offense then recorded a three-and-out, but got the ball back after Reggie Daniels intercepted Anu Solomon on third down. The Ducks and Wildcats then traded punts, with Oregon maintaining possession going into the second quarter with the score at 3–0 in favor of Arizona.

On the second play of the second quarter the Ducks scored on a trick play with running back Royce Freeman lobbing a 26-yard touchdown pass to quarterback Marcus Mariota, his second receiving touchdown as a Duck. The two teams again traded punts, and then traded fumbles, keeping the score at 7–3 going into halftime.

Coming out the locker rooms after halftime the Wildcats scored on a 3-yard run by Nick Wilson. Oregon responded following a 72-yard drive capped off with a 6-yard touchdown pass from Mariota to Devon Allen. Arizona continued to pressure Oregon offensively, and scored on a 2-yard run by Nick Wilson, regaining the lead with a score of 17–14. The Wildcats then forced a three-and-out by the Ducks and scored again, on a 34-yard pass from Solomon to Wilson, extending their lead to 24–14.

The Ducks maintained possession going into the fourth quarter with a ten-point deficit to make up. They finished their drive with a 21-yard field goal by Matt Wogan, putting the score at 24–17 in favor of Arizona. The Oregon defense then forced a turnover on downs, giving the ball back to their offense, which scored a touchdown on a 9-yard pass from Mariota to Keanon Lowe, evening the score at 24. The Wildcats then drove 71 yards in five and a half minutes, scoring on a 1-yard run by Terris Jones-Grigsby. The Ducks, with just under three minutes to play, were driving quickly down the field, converting two first downs, only to be stopped by a strip sack of Mariota by Scooby Wright III. The Wildcats then ran out the clock, sealing their second victory over the Ducks in as many years.

The Ducks maintained their lead in the all-time series, 24–16 (.600); however, every victory earned by the Wildcats since 2007 has been a major upset of the Ducks with each win coming over an Oregon team ranked in the top ten at the time of the game (2007 #2; 2013 #10; 2014 #2). The main storyline following the game continued to be the Ducks' beleaguered offensive line, allowing Mariota to be sacked five times during the game, and unable to effectively run-block or fight back against a three-man pass rush.

During the game, the Ducks wore uniforms with pink numbers and highlights in recognition of Breast Cancer Awareness Month and to raise money for the Kay Yow Cancer Fund. Additionally, during the playing of the National Anthem the Oregon Marching Band paid tribute to a former trumpet player who lost a battle with cancer during the summer.

UCLA

In their sixth game of the season the twelfth-ranked Ducks defeated the eighteenth-ranked UCLA Bruins at the Rose Bowl in Los Angeles, CA. With both teams coming off of stinging defeats at home by conference opponents, the game was billed to be a slugfest, with both teams fighting for their season. The expectation proved to be far from the reality that ensued.

To start the game both teams traded punts, seemingly still on edge because of their performances from the previous week. Oregon eventually struck first, scoring on a 13-yard run by Marcus Mariota after UCLA's Brett Hundley was strip sacked by Tony Washington. The Ducks converted a two-point attempt making the score 8–0 in their favor. The Bruins responded by driving the ball 70 yards in almost 8 minutes that spanned the rest of the first quarter into the second quarter to their own two-yard line; however, they were unable to punch it through a stout Duck defense and were forced to kick a field goal, making the score 8–3.

After returning the kickoff following the field goal, the Oregon offense proved to be back in true form, driving the ball 72 yards and scoring on a 21-yard pass from Mariota to Thomas Tyner putting the score at 15–3 with just under 10 minutes to go in the second quarter. UCLA responded to their increasing deficit by quickly driving the length of the field, converting three consecutive first downs, only to be stopped again in the red zone, this time missing the field goal. The Ducks would respond by scoring again, this time on a 31-yard pass from Mariota to Pharaoh Brown, they would miss the PAT, making the score 21–3 with three minutes to go until half-time. The Bruins made the most of their time by scoring on an 84-yard drive, leaving the Ducks with just three seconds on the clock with the score at 21–10. Oregon ran out the three seconds and went into half-time with the lead.

UCLA received the ball to begin the second half; after gaining 23 yards they were forced to punt back to Oregon. The Ducks again completed a long drive down the field, this time 80 yards, ending a play that made Marcus Mariota looking more like a point-guard than a quarterback. From their opponent's three-yard line the Ducks ran their staple zone-read play, this time Mariota kept the ball, attempting to run it in for a score. He was tripped on his way to end-zone, dropped the football only to have it bounce back into his hands, causing a defender to freeze just long enough for Mariota to find the end-zone for another score, making the score 28–10 in their favor. The Oregon offense didn't have to wait long to get back on the field after their scoring drive as UCLA's Brett Hundley was intercepted by All-American cornerback Ifo Ekpre-Olomu on their second play of the drive. The Ducks would score two plays later on a 4-yard run by Royce Freeman making the score 35–10. UCLA got the ball back and traded punts with Oregon, with the Ducks maintaining possession going into the fourth quarter, ahead by 25.

The Ducks scored again early in the fourth quarter on another Royce Freeman run, this time from just two yards out making the score 42–10. UCLA responded with a 93-yard drive ending a touchdown complete with a two-point conversion, reducing their deficit to 42–18 with just under ten minuted to go. The Ducks put in their second string and tried to run out the clock, however UCLA forced a punt and almost succeeded in achieving what would have been one of the greatest comebacks in school history. With eight minutes left in the game, the Bruins drove 67 yards in three minutes, scored a touchdown and missed two-point attempt making the score 42–24 with 4:21 left to play. The Bruins then recovered an onside kick and again completed a quick scoring drive, missing the two-point attempt to make the score 42–30 with 2:47 to go. The Bruins were unable to recover their next onside kick and with their time outs exhausted by the previous drives they were unable to stop the Ducks from running out the clock, leaving the final score 42–30.

Even though they lost, UCLA maintained their lead in the overall series, 39-28 (.582), however Oregon maintains a seven-year win streak (the two teams did not play in 2011).

Washington

In their annual rivalry game, Oregon defeated the Washington Huskies in Eugene for the eleventh consecutive year, winning each game by at least a margin of 17 points, however, the Huskies still lead the all-time series 58-45-5 (.560).

In winning their sixth game of the season the Ducks became bowl eligible for the tenth consecutive year, tied for tenth in longest active consecutive bowl appearances. The Ducks have played in a bowl game 19 times since the 1989 season with a record of 9-10 (.474), having missed the postseason only four times (1991, 1993, 1996 & 2004).

California

In their eighth game the Ducks defeated the California Golden Bears at the newly opened Levi's Stadium in Santa Clara, CA, extending their win streak over the Bears to six seasons. California maintains their lead the all-time series 39-36-2 (.519).

During the game Oregon quarterback Marcus Mariota eclipsed the Oregon record for career passing yards, making him the record holder at Oregon in career total offensive yards, career total touchdowns, career passing yards and career passing touchdowns. Additionally, running back Royce Freeman broke the Oregon record for true freshman rushing yards.

Stanford

In their ninth game the Ducks defeated the Stanford Cardinal in Eugene, winning over the Cardinal for the first time since 2011. The Cardinal maintain their lead the all-time series 46–31–1 (.596).

Utah

In their tenth game of the season the Ducks defeated the Utah Utes in Salt Lake City. The Ducks extended their lead in the all-time series 20-8 (.714).

By winning this game the Ducks won the Pac-12 North Division, guaranteeing themselves a spot in 2014 Pac-12 Football Championship Game, they are the first team to win the Pac-12 North Division title outright, and have been co-champions in all other years.

During the game starting Oregon center Hroniss Grasu appeared to severely injure his knee, followed by starting tight end Pharaoh Brown severely injuring his lower right leg just a few minutes later.

Colorado

In their final game at home the Ducks defeated the Colorado Buffaloes in Eugene and in doing so they increased their lead the all-time series to 11-8 (.579).

Oregon State – 118th Civil War

In the 2014 edition of the Civil War, Oregon defeated their in-state rival the Oregon State Beavers in Corvallis, OR 47–19 in their seventh straight victory in the 118-year-old series. The Ducks extend their lead the all-time series 62-46-10 (.568).

Arizona – Pac-12 Championship Game

On December 5, 2014, the Ducks won their 12th Pac-12 Conference Championship by defeating the Arizona Wildcats, the only team to defeat the Ducks this so far in the season, 51–13 in the 2014 Pac-12 Football Championship Game. The Ducks snapped a two-game losing streak against the Wildcats, extending their lead in the overall series to 25-16. Winning this game gives Oregon their 12th win on the year, their fourth 12-win season in the last five years.

In winning the Pac-12 Conference Championship the Ducks all but assured themselves of a berth in the inaugural College Football Playoff, the seeding of which will be announced two days after the game on Sunday December 7, 2014.

During the game, star quarterback Marcus Mariota had another highlight filled performance, throwing for over 300 yards and two touchdowns, while scoring three touchdowns on the ground. This performance, along with a standout junior season has seen Mariota secure the Pac-12 Conference records for career total touchdowns (131) and single season total touchdowns (53) as well as the Oregon team records for career total offensive yards (12,289), career passing yards (10,125), career passing touchdowns (101), single season total offensive yards (4,478), single season passing yards (3,783) and single season passing touchdowns (38). As of this writing Mariota, along with breaking every Oregon career and single season record for passing and total offense, he has thrown for just two interceptions. Many in the media have stated that following this dominant win Mariota has guaranteed that he will become the first Heisman Trophy winner in Oregon Ducks history, possibly becoming the first ever unanimous selection for the prestigious award.

CFP Playoff

Florida State – CFP Semifinal at the Rose Bowl

On January 1, 2015, the Ducks ended the 29-game win streak of the ACC champion Florida State Seminoles in the Rose Bowl, Florida State's first loss since November 24, 2012. Oregon's 59 points were the most ever scored in a Rose Bowl.  Their 41 points in the second half were also the most ever scored in one half of a Rose Bowl. The 2015 Rose Bowl served as a semifinal in the inaugural year of the College Football Playoff; by winning the Ducks advanced to the College Football Playoff National Championship Game, facing the Ohio State Buckeyes.

Ohio State – National Championship Game

Following victories in their respective bowl games on January 1, the No. 2 Ducks and the No. 4 Buckeyes advanced to face each other in the inaugural College Football Playoff National Championship at AT&T Stadium. Coming into the game, Oregon had never beaten Ohio State, holding an 0–8 all-time record against the Buckeyes.

Oregon won the coin toss and elected to receive the ball the start the game. The Ducks' first drive featured running back Thomas Tyner and quarterback Marcus Mariota driving Oregon 75-yards and scoring on a 7-yard touchdown pass from Mariota to Keanon Lowe to give Oregon an early 7–0 lead. The Buckeye offense struggled on their first drive, going only 17-yards, and was forced to punt. The Buckeye defense stopped Oregon at midfield on their next possession and forced them to punt, setting up Ohio State inside their own 3-yard line. During the drive, Ohio State went 97-yard and scored their first points of the game on a 33-yard touchdown run from Ezekiel Elliott, tying the game at 7–7. The Buckeye defense forced the Ducks to punt on their next two possessions. The Ohio State offense took advantage by scoring on a touchdown pass from Cardale Jones to Nick Vannett, making the score 14–7 Ohio State at the end of the first quarter.

On the fourth play of the second quarter, Ohio State turned the ball over on a fumble by Cardale Jones, giving the Ducks' possession of the ball at own 41-yard line. The Ducks' drove down to the Ohio State 3-yard line, but were unable to take advantage of the turnover after failing to convert on fourth down. The Buckeye offense took over at their own 1-yard line and quickly drove to midfield. The drive ended, however, on another Ohio State turnover, this time on a pass from Jones to Devin Smith that was fumbled by Smith, which allowed Oregon to take over at their own 9-yard line. Oregon, again, was unable to capitalize off of the turnover, with the Buckeye defense forcing a three and out. The ensuing Ohio State possession took only 6 plays and ended with a touchdown run from Jones, giving Ohio State a 21–7 lead. The next Ducks' possession went 66-yards in 12 plays and ended with a 26-yard field goal from Aidan Schneider. After the Oregon defense forced a three and out on the Buckeyes' next possession, Oregon went into halftime, trailing Ohio State 21–10.

Ohio State received the opening kickoff of the second half. Ohio State turned the ball over on their first possession of the half on a Cardale Jones pass intercepted by Danny Mattingly returned to the Oregon 30-yard line. The Ducks took advantage of the turnover in one play on a 70-yard touchdown pass from Marcus Mariota to Byron Marshall, making the score 21–17 Ohio State. The Buckeyes' turned the ball over for a fourth time on their next possession, with Jones fumbling the ball inside Ohio State territory. Aidan Schneider made a 23-yard field goal off of the turnover, with the score 21–20 Ohio State. The Buckeyes' ensuing possession went 75-yards in 12 plays, ending on a 9-yard touchdown run from Ezekiel Elliott to make the score 28–20 Ohio State at the end of the third quarter.

After a Buckeye defensive stop, the Ohio State offense and Ezekiel Elliott again scored a touchdown, making the score 35–20 Ohio State early in the fourth quarter. Both teams exchanged punts on their drives. With less than three minutes remaining in the game, the Oregon offense attempt to convert a fourth down, though the pass from Marcus Mariota was incomplete. Ohio State regained possession and scored on a third touchdown from Elliott. The last play of the game was a Mariota pass that was intercepted by Eli Apple and made the final score 42–20. With the loss, Oregon's all-time record against Ohio State fell to 0–9.

Statistics

Team
As of 1/1/2015.

Offense

Defense

Key: POS: Position, SOLO: Solo Tackles, AST: Assisted Tackles, TOT: Total Tackles, TFL: Tackles-for-loss, SACK: Quarterback Sacks, INT: Interceptions, BU: Passes Broken Up, PD: Passes Defended, QBH: Quarterback Hits, FF: Forced Fumbles, FR: Fumbles Recovered, BLK: Kicks or Punts Blocked, SAF: Safeties

Special teams

Post-season

Awards

NCFAA AwardsHeisman TrophyMarcus Mariota (2014)Maxwell AwardMarcus Mariota (2014)Walter Camp AwardMarcus Mariota (2014)Davey O'Brien AwardMarcus Mariota (2014)Johnny Unitas Golden Arm AwardMarcus Mariota

Reference:

Pac-12 Conference AwardsOffensive Player of the YearMarcus MariotaFreshman Offensive Player of the YearRoyce Freeman

Reference:

Team AwardsSkeie's AwardMarcus Mariota 3rdWilford Gonyea AwardMarcus Mariota 2nd
Keanon LoweMost Outstanding Defensive PlayerEric DarganTodd Doxey AwardKeanon LoweLen Casanova AwardRoyce FreemanElmer Sahlstrom AwardKenny BassettDuane J. Cargill Memorial AwardPharaoh BrownPancake Club Award 
Tyrell CrosbyEd Moshofsky Trophy 
Hroniss GrasuGordon E. Wilson Award 
Charles NelsonDudley Clarke Memorial AwardJoe WalkerJoe Schaffeld Trophy 
DeForest BucknerScout Team Player of the YearAyele Ford & Michael MannsScout Team Special Teams Player of the YearTony James

Reference:

All-American Teams

All-Americans
Each year several publications release lists of their ideal "team". The athletes on these lists are referred to as All-Americans. The NCAA recognizes five All-American lists. They are the Associated Press (AP), American Football Coaches Association (AFCA), Football Writers Association of America (FWAA), Sporting News (SN), and the Walter Camp Football Foundation (WCFF). If a player is selected to the first team of three publications he is considered a consensus All-American, if a player is selected to the first team of all five publications he is considered a unanimous All-American.Marcus Mariota, quarterback, Junior, (AP, AFCA, FWAA, SN, WCFF)
Hroniss Grasu, center, Senior (AP, SN, WCFF)
Jake Fisher, tackle, Senior (AP, FWAA)
Ifo Ekpre-Olomu, Defensive back, Senior (AP, AFCA, SN, WCFF)
Key:
First team
Consensus All-American
Unanimous All-American

Pac-12 All-Conference Team
The Ducks had 10 players honored as members of the 2014 Pac-12 All-Conference team, with five each on the first and second teams, respectively. Four other Ducks earned honorable mention honors.First TeamPharaoh Brown, TE, JR
Ifo Ekpre-Olomu, CB, JR
Jake Fisher, OL, SR
Hroniss Grasu, OL, SR
Marcus Mariota, QB, JRSecond TeamDeForest Buckner, LB, JR
Erick Dargan, FS, SR
Royce Freeman, RB, FR
Troy Hill, CB, SR
Charles Nelson, WR, FRHonorable MentionArik Armstead, DE, JR
Byron Marshall, RB, JR
Hamani Stevens, OL, SR
Joe Walker, LB, JR

All-Academic Teams

NCAA Academic All-Americans

Pac-12 Conference All-Academic Players
The Ducks had two players selected to the Pac-12 Conference All-Academic Second Team, six players granted honorable mention and no players selected to the First Team. In order to be eligible for the academic team a player must maintain a minimum 3.0 overall grade-point average and play in at least 50 percent of their team's games.Second TeamMarcus Mariota, QB, JR, 3.22 GPA, General Science Major
Doug Brenner, OL, FR, 3.56 GPA, Business Administration MajorHonorable MentionDevon Allen, WR, FR
Taylor Alie, QB, FR
Kenny Bassett, RB, SR
Jake Fisher, OL, SR
Matt Pierson, OL, JR
Matt Wogan, PK, SO

Reference:

Records broken Marcus MariotaPac-12Career Total Touchdowns – 126 TDs
Pac-12, Matt Barkley – 122 TDs, 2009 - 2012
Oregon, Joey Harrington – 78 TDs, 1998 - 2001
Single Season Total Touchdowns – 48 TDs
Pac-12, Matt Barkley – 41 TDs, 2011
Oregon, Marcus Mariota – 40 TDs, 2013OregonCareer Total Offensive Yards – 11,943 yards
Bill Musgrave – 8,140 yards, 1987 - 1990
Career Passing Yards – 9,812 yards
Bill Musgrave – 8,343 yards, 1987 - 1990
Career Passing Touchdowns – 99 TDs
Darron Thomas – 66 TDs, 2008 - 2011
Single Season Passing Touchdowns – 36 TDs
Darron Thomas – 33 TDs, 2011Royce FreemanOregon'''
Freshman Total Touchdowns – 18 TDs
Freshman Rushing Yards – 1,195 yards
Freshman Rushing Touchdowns – 16 TDs

NFL Draft and Draft Evaluations

NFL draft
The following members of 2014 Oregon Ducks football team were selected in the 2015 NFL Draft.

NFL Draft Combine
Seven members of the 2014 team were invited to participate in drills at the 2015 NFL scouting Combine.

† Top performer

Senior Bowls

Notes
 April 7, 2014 – Johnathan Loyd, Oregon Basketball's all-time winningest player utilizes his fifth year of eligibility in a different sport (a sport other than basketball) to play the wide receiver position for the Oregon Football Team.
 May 5, 2014 – Linebacker Rahim Cassell is arrested by Eugene Police for Driving Under the Influence of Intoxicants (DUII).
 May 12, 2014 – Quarterback Jake Rodrigues announces that he is seeking to transfer from the University of Oregon. Rodrigues was outperformed by fellow back-up quarterback Jeff Lockie during spring practices and was informed that Lockie would be the second-string quarterback in the fall. Rodrigues is a former 4-star recruit from the 2012 class.
 May 17, 2014 – Quarterback Damion Hobbs announces that he is seeking to transfer from the University of Oregon. Hobbs was outperformed by fellow back-up quarterbacks Jeff Lockie and Jake Rodrigues during spring practices and was informed that Lockie would be the second-string quarterback in the fall. Hobbs is a former 3-star recruit from the 2013 class.
 June 6, 2014 – Linebacker Tyrell Robinson announces that he is seeking to transfer from the University of Oregon.
 June 12, 2014 – Defensive back Eric Amoako announces that he is seeking to transfer from the University of Oregon so that he can play closer to his native state of Texas.
 June 14, 2014 – Wide receiver Devon Allen wins the 2014 NCAA Championship in 110 meter hurdles, setting the second fastest time in NCAA history.
 June 18, 2014 – Linebacker Oshay Dunmore announces that he is seeking to transfer from the University of Oregon. Anonymous sources link his departure with that of Tyrell Robinson, saying that their scholarships were not going be renewed due to unspecified violations of team rules.
 June 29, 2014 – Devon Allen wins the 2014 USA Outdoor Track and Field Championship in 110 meter hurdles, becoming the first athlete to win the NCAA title and USATF title in the same year since 1979. Allen beat out a field of 6 professionals, including 2 Olympians as well as a fellow Pac-12 athlete, Aleec Harris from USC.
 August 11, 2014 – Oregon announces that left tackle Tyler Johnstone re-tore his ACL during a summer practice and will undergo surgery. Johnstone initially tore the ACL during the 2013 Alamo Bowl and was expecting to play in the 2014 season, however with the new injury he is projected to be out for the season.
 December 17, 2014 – Oregon announces that All-American cornerback Ifo Ekpre-Olomu has suffered a season ending ACL tear during practice.

References

Oregon
Oregon Ducks football seasons
Pac-12 Conference football champion seasons
Rose Bowl champion seasons
Oregon Ducks football